Arthur Marohn (born 14 June 1893, date of death unknown) was a German international footballer.

References

1893 births
Year of death missing
Association football forwards
German footballers
Germany international footballers